Terrence M. "Tim" Callahan was a Democratic Party member of the Montana House of Representatives, representing District 21 from 2000 till 2008. Callahan served as a member of the Appropriations Committee and its Joint Appropriations Subcommittee on Long-Range Planning. A term-limits law prevented him from contesting the 2008 election to the House.

External links
Project Vote Smart - Representative Terrence M. 'Tim' Callahan (MT) profile
Follow the Money - Tim Callahan
2006 - 2004 - 2002 - 2000 Montana House campaign contributions

Notes

1955 births
Living people
Democratic Party members of the Montana House of Representatives